A homework coach is a category of a tutor whose mission is to help a student's overall academic success instead of providing remedial instruction in a specific subject. A parent might hire a homework coach when their child is struggling in school, not because they have difficulties with the academic material but because of problems with study skills, organization, executive function skills and motivation. The goal of the coach is to teach the child to become a successful student by learning to plan assignments, organize materials, manage time effectively and, in the case of an ADHD student, learn ways to manage the symptoms of their attention deficit disorder. As such, the role of a homework coach is similar to ADHD coaching but is focused specifically on success in school. Some providers use the term "homework helper" as well as "homework coach."

Applicability
A homework coach is indicated for any student whose poor performance in school or college appears to be more related to organization and study skills rather than difficulty understanding the instructional material. Such students may show signs of ADHD or Executive Function disorder. Current statistics published by the Centers for Disease Control show that as many as 11% of school children 4–17 years of age have received an ADHD diagnosis. Among ADHD students, about 33% will not graduate high school with their peers, which is about twice the rate of the non-ADHD student population.  By hiring a homework coach, parents hope that the added support in building study skills, helping plan assign assignments, test-taking strategies and general homework monitoring will keep their children on track in school and increase their chances of graduating on time.

Effectiveness
Parents generally measure the efficiency of homework coaching in terms of higher grades and less discord in the household over their student's homework habits. There are also many anecdotal news stories and case studies about how a homework coach has helped students improve their grades and self-confidence. The intensity and tempo of homeworkers affect stress resistance and quite an emotional state of the pupil. The correct approach to implementing tasks will allow for performing all tasks with maximum efficiency.

See also
Tutor
Coaching
Mentorship

References

Life coaching
Educational psychology
Teaching
Special education